Krisztina may refer to:

Krisztina Barta (born 1991), Hungarian ice dancer
Krisztina Bodri (born 1986), beauty queen who represented Hungary in Miss World 2007 in China
Krisztina Csáky (1654–1723)  Hungarian countess
Krisztina Czakó (born 1978), former Hungarian figure skater
Krisztina Egerszegi (born 1974), Hungarian former World Record holding swimmer and Hungarian Olympic champion
Krisztina Fazekas (born 1980), Hungarian sprint canoeist
Krisztina Holly, Hungarian American innovator, entrepreneur, and creator of the first TEDx
Krisztina Morvai (born 1963), Hungarian lawyer and Human Rights lecturer and author
Krisztina Papp (born 1982), Hungarian long-distance runner
Krisztina Pigniczki (born 1975), Hungarian team handball player and Olympic medalist
Krisztina Regőczy (born 1955), former figure skater from Hungary
Krisztina Sereny (born 1976), professional fitness competitor from Budapest, Hungary
Krisztina Solti (born 1968), retired Hungarian high jumper
Krisztina Szabó, Hungarian-Canadian mezzo-soprano
Krisztina Szremkó (born 1972), female water polo player from Hungary
Krisztina Tóth (born 1974), Hungarian table tennis player

See also
Krisztina Téri Iskola, 220-year-old historic school in Budapest, Hungary
Christina (given name)
Kristina (disambiguation)

Hungarian feminine given names

no:Krisztina